What Passes for Survival is the third studio album by Pyrrhon, released on April 1, 2017 by Willowtip Records.

Critical reception

Reception towards the album was fairly positive. Spyros Stasis for PopMatters called the album "the apex moment for Pyrhhon" and that "even though the leap forward is not as substantial as it was from debut to sophomore records, the band is still able to improve further, displaying a clearer vision and highlighting more clearly the intricacies of its sound." George Parr for Astral Noize stated that the band "continues to flaunt its avant-garde extremity on their third LP, taking maniacal twists and turns, ever adapting but always remaining an aurally challenging style oozing with unparalleled ferocity." Clavier for Sputnikmusic stated that the album "pushes compositional anarchy to its limits, engaging in an extremely loose structuring of its tracks on both a macro and micro level" but criticized the album for being repetitive at times. Dan Obstkrieg for Your Last Rites stated the album "reinforces the notion that music, like language, like life, makes marks directly on bodies" as well calling it their most diverse outing to date.

Track listing

Personnel
Adapted from What Passes for Survival liner notes.

Pyrrhon
 Dylan DiLella – electric guitar
 Erik Malave – bass guitar
 Doug Moore – vocals
 Steve Schwegler – drums

Production and additional personnel
 Caroline Harrison – cover art, design
 Colin Marston – recording, mixing, mastering

Release history

References

External links 
 
 What Passes for Survival at Bandcamp

2017 albums
Pyrrhon (band) albums
Willowtip Records albums